The Summerlin Home News was a weekly newspaper, distributed on Fridays, that covered the areas of Summerlin, Desert Shores and Queensridge in the western sections of the Las Vegas Valley. It consisted of two editions, each with a circulation of about 30,000.

History
It was founded in October 2005 as the Summerlin News, launching at the same time as the West Valley News. In 2008, the West Valley News was eliminated and the Summerlin News was rebranded as the Summerlin Home News, in keeping with the flagship paper of the chain, the Henderson Home News.

On February 24, 2009, Greenspun Media Group announced it would no longer publish the Summerlin Home News.

Editions
SW edition is distributed in and covers zip codes 89134, 89135, and 89138.
NE edition is distributed in and covers zip codes 89128, 89144, and 89145.

External links
 Summerlin Home News, SW edition
 Summerlin Home News, NE edition

Weekly newspapers published in the United States
Newspapers published in Nevada
Newspapers published in Las Vegas
Publications established in 2005